Doppelganger is a Singaporean Chinese drama which was produced by Wawa Pictures and telecast on Singapore's free-to-air channel, Mediacorp Channel 8. It was first shown in 2018, and was broadcast on weeknights. The show aired at 9 p.m. on weekdays and had a repeat telecast at 8 a.m. the following day. This drama serial consists of 20 episodes, and it stars Christopher Lee and Fann Wong.

The drama was the first drama with a prequel, which was first aired on Toggle on 11 March 2018 from 7 to 9 pm as a telemovie.

Casts

Li (Jianting) Family

Supporting Cast

Xiong Cai Pictures Entertainment

Awards & Nominations

Doppelganger is up for 4 nominations.

It won 1 out of 4 nominations , which is the Best Newcomer.

Star Awards 2019

Trivia 
 Christopher Lee and Fann Wong first time acting as couple and acting together after 14 years.
 Christopher Lee's first dual role and villainous role, in which both role are villains.
 Christopher Lee and Xu Bin's second drama collaboration after Against the Tide in 2014.
 This will be Xu Bin's first villainous role.
 This is Rebecca Lim's third time acting as a villain.
 A prequel was shown on toggle and channel 8 before the show is aired.

Original Sound Track (OST)

See also
 List of programmes broadcast by Mediacorp Channel 8

References

Singapore Chinese dramas
2018 Singaporean television series debuts
Mediacorp Chinese language programmes
Channel 8 (Singapore) original programming